Paul Jordan may refer to:

Paul Jordan (artist) (1916–2006), Polish-American artist
Paul T. Jordan (born 1941), American physician and mayor of Jersey City, New Jersey
Paul Jordan (motorcyclist) (born 1991), Grand Prix motorcycle racer from Ireland

See also
Paul Jordan-Smith (1885–1971), American journalist, editor, and author
Paul Jordaan (born 1992), South African rugby union footballer